Thiago Ribeiro Cardoso (born 24 February 1986), known as Thiago Ribeiro, is a Brazilian footballer who plays as a forward for Londrina.

Club career

Early career
Born in Pontes Gestal, São Paulo state, Thiago Ribeiro started his career at Rio Branco-SP. He played in five matches for the club during his debut year, notably scoring in a 2–1 Campeonato Paulista away loss against Corinthians on 24 January 2004.

Thiago Ribeiro was loaned to Ligue 1 side Bordeaux for 2004–05 season, along with Adonis Soares Pavani in June 2004. He made his debut in the category on 28 August, coming on as a late substitute for Juan Pablo Francia in a 2–0 home win against Sochaux.

São Paulo
On 29 July 2005 Thiago Ribeiro returned to his native state, signing for São Paulo. He made his debut for the club on 14 August, replacing Amoroso in a 3–2 home win against Fortaleza, and scored his first goal on 16 October in a 6–1 away routing of Flamengo.

On 19 November 2005, Thiago Ribeiro scored a hat-trick in a 4–2 home success over Figueirense. He was also included in the 2005 FIFA Club World Championship 23-man squad, but remained unused in both matches as his side was crowned champions.

Thiago Ribeiro was also Tricolor's top goalscorer in the 2006 Campeonato Paulista. However, he struggled to appear regularly during the following years, and left the club.

Al Rayyan
Thiago Ribeiro was loaned to Al Rayyan in 2007 (the club also bought half of his rights), and scored a goal in 2007 AFC Champions League.

Cruzeiro
Thiago Ribeiro returned to Brazil on 29 August 2008, after agreeing to a five-year contract with Cruzeiro in the top tier. An investment group bought back the 50% economic rights for US$2 million for Cruzeiro.

Thiago Ribeiro made his debut for the club on 14 September 2008, starting in a 1–0 home loss against Palmeiras. His first goal came seven days later, in a 4–3 away win against Figueirense.

Thiago Ribeiro became top-scorer of 2010 Copa Libertadores with eight goals; highlights included a hat-trick in a 3–1 home win against Nacional on 30 April. On 24 October, he scored a brace in a 4–3 home loss against rivals Atlético Mineiro.

Cagliari
On 16 August 2011 Thiago Ribeiro joined Cagliari from Rentistas for €3,353,500 with option to purchases. He made his Serie A debut on 11 September, starting in a 2–1 away win against Roma; his first goal came eight days later, in a home success over Novara for the same scoreline.

On 1 February 2012, Thiago Ribeiro scored a brace in a 4–3 home win against Roma. He ended the season as a starter, contributing with five goals in 35 matches as his side managed to avoid relegation.

On 3 July 2012 Cagliari bought Thiago Ribeiro outright for another €2,120,000. Cagliari had paid Rentistas a total of €5,473,500 for him.

Santos

On 19 July 2013, Thiago Ribeiro returned to his country by signing a four-year deal with Santos, for a fee of €3,325,000 (R$ 10.814 million plus variables). He was assigned the number 11 jersey, previously held by Neymar, as the club was among a restructuration.

Thiago Ribeiro made his debut for the club on 11 August 2013, starting and scoring the first in a 2–1 away win against Internacional. A first team regular, he ended the year with seven goals in 24 appearances.

Thiago Ribeiro remained as an undisputed starter the following campaign, scoring braces against Corinthians (5–1 home win) and Oeste (4–1 home win) and finishing the 2014 Campeonato Paulista with six goals. In May, however, struggled with several injuries during the year, being sidelined for more than three months.

Thiago Ribeiro was transfer listed by Peixe in February 2015, as the club was facing serious financial problems, mainly due to his high wages.

Atlético Mineiro (loan)
On 8 April 2015, Thiago Ribeiro was loaned to fellow league team Atlético Mineiro until May 2016. He quickly established himself as a starter, finishing the 2015 season with 36 appearances and nine goals, helping Atlético finish second in the year's Brasileirão.

In the 2016 pre-season, Thiago Ribeiro made two appearances in the Florida Cup, of which Atlético were crowned champions. He then picked up an injury and spent the next month recovering. In March, following the signings of Robinho and Hyuri, he fell down the pecking order and mutually terminated his loan contract with Atlético two months before its expiry.

Bahia (loan)
On 16 March 2016, Thiago Ribeiro was loaned to Série B club Bahia until the end of the year. He was separated from the squad in July, and later revealed that a depression issue had been affecting his performances since the end of 2014.

Return to Santos
Returning to Santos ahead of the 2017 campaign, Thiago Ribeiro played his first match on 3 February by replacing Jonathan Copete and scoring the last in a 6–2 home routing of Linense.

Guarani FC
Ribeiro signed with Guarani FC for the 2019 season.

Red Bull Bragantino
On 20 April 2019 Ribeiro signed for Red Bull Bragantino until December, for the 2019 Campeonato Brasileiro Série B season.

Career statistics

Honours
São Paulo
FIFA Club World Cup: 2005 
Campeonato Brasileiro Série A: 2006

Cruzeiro
Campeonato Mineiro: 2009, 2011

Atlético Mineiro
Campeonato Mineiro: 2015

Bragantino
Campeonato Brasileiro Série B: 2019

Individual
Copa Libertadores top scorer: 2010

References

External links
 
 

1986 births
Living people
Footballers from São Paulo (state)
Brazilian footballers
Brazilian expatriate footballers
Association football forwards
Rio Branco Esporte Clube players
São Paulo FC players
Cruzeiro Esporte Clube players
Santos FC players
Clube Atlético Mineiro players
Esporte Clube Bahia players
FC Girondins de Bordeaux players
Al-Rayyan SC players
C.A. Rentistas players
Cagliari Calcio players
Londrina Esporte Clube players
Guarani FC players
Red Bull Bragantino players
Grêmio Novorizontino players
Associação Chapecoense de Futebol players
Ligue 1 players
Campeonato Brasileiro Série A players
Campeonato Brasileiro Série B players
Serie A players
Qatar Stars League players
Brazilian expatriate sportspeople in France
Brazilian expatriate sportspeople in Qatar
Brazilian expatriate sportspeople in Italy
Expatriate footballers in France
Expatriate footballers in Qatar
Expatriate footballers in Italy